Robert Daniell (born 1646) was a British soldier who was governor of the Province of South Carolina from 1716 to 1717.

Daniell was born on 20 April 1646 and lived in Llanddewi Brefi, Cardiganshire, Wales. He was a ten times great grandson of King Edward III.

Daniell arrived in Charleston, South Carolina in 1669 as captain of the ship The Daniell. In 1682, he was commissioned as major of the Goose Creek Men. By 1691, he was commissioned as a colonel under King William III. In 1702 he led forces in James Moore's expedition to St. Augustine, which unsuccessfully besieged the Castillo de San Marcos.  He later led provincial forces in the 1711 Tuscarora War and the 1715 Yamasee War.

Daniell served as deputy governor of the British colonial Province of North Carolina from 1704 to 1705, and as governor of the Province of South Carolina from 1716 to 1717.

Legacy
Daniel Island in Charleston, of which he was an early owner, is named for him.

References

External links

Descendants of Governor Robert Daniell at Genealogy.com

1646 births
1718 deaths
British military personnel of the War of the Spanish Succession
Colonial governors of South Carolina
Deputy governors of North Carolina (1691–1712)
Landgraves of Carolina